Tecia Lyn Torres Moncaio (born August 16, 1989) is an American mixed martial artist who is currently competing in the strawweight division of the Ultimate Fighting Championship (UFC). As of October 24, 2022, she is #8 in the UFC women's strawweight rankings.

Background
Torres was born in Fall River, Massachusetts, but moved to Coral Springs with her single mom, older sister and a younger brother at the age of five. Torres has been involved in martial arts since age 3. She began in taekwondo as a child, and received her black belt after twelve years practicing the sport. She also has an amateur muay thai record of sixteen victories and four losses.

Torres graduated at 20 years old in 2010 with a Bachelor of Arts, double majoring in Criminal Justice and Sociology from Florida Atlantic University. She earned her master's degree in Criminology from the same college in 2017.

She is of Puerto Rican, Portuguese and Irish descent. Her family has roots in Maunabo, Puerto Rico.

Mixed martial arts career

Early career
Torres started her amateur mixed martial arts career in 2011. She won each of her seven bouts, obtaining 115-pound titles in MMA Solutions, US Freedom Fighter Championship and American Battle Championships.

In 2012, Torres moved to professional mixed martial arts and signed with Invicta Fighting Championships.

Invicta Fighting Championships
Torres made her professional and promotional debut against Kaiyana Rain on October 6, 2012, at Invicta FC 3: Penne vs. Sugiyama. She won via unanimous decision.

Torres faced Paige VanZant on January 5, 2013, at Invicta FC 4: Esparza vs. Hyatt, winning on all judges' score cards. She then won a unanimous decision over Rose Namajunas on July 13, 2013 at Invicta FC 6: Coenen vs. Cyborg. Her final bout of 2013 was against Felice Herrig on December 7, 2013, at Invicta FC 7: Honchak vs. Smith. She won via unanimous decision.

The Ultimate Fighter

In December 2013, Torres was announced as one of 11 women signed by the Ultimate Fighting Championship (UFC) for its newly created strawweight division. It was also announced that she would compete as a cast member on The Ultimate Fighter reality series, as part of a tournament to crown the inaugural strawweight champion. In the season premiere of The Ultimate Fighter, Torres was selected by Team Melendez with the second pick. Third-ranked Torres was matched against #14 Randa Markos. She lost the fight by unanimous decision.

Torres was the overall no. 3 seed in the tournament and picked second by coach Gilbert Melendez. She faced Randa Markos in the preliminary round of the show. In a surprise upset, Torres lost the fight via unanimous decision over three rounds. She, however, was allowed back into the tournament when Justine Kish injured her knee in training. She was transferred to the team run by Anthony Pettis and defeated Bec Rawlings in the preliminary round by unanimous decision. She faced Carla Esparza in the quarter-finals and lost via majority decision in two rounds.

Ultimate Fighting Championship
Torres made her UFC debut against fellow Ultimate Fighter competitor Angela Magaña at The Ultimate Fighter: A Champion Will Be Crowned Finale on December 12, 2014. She won the fight via dominant unanimous decision, out-striking Magaña two-to-one over the course of three rounds.

Torres next faced TUF 20 alum Angela Hill on June 13, 2015, at UFC 188. She won the fight by unanimous decision.

Torres was next expected to face former Invicta FC Atomweight Champion Michelle Waterson at UFC 194. However, Waterson pulled out of the bout on November 24, 2015, citing a knee injury. She was replaced by promotional newcomer Jocelyn Jones-Lybarger. Torres won the fight by unanimous decision.

Torres faced Rose Namajunas in a rematch on April 16, 2016, at UFC on Fox 19. She lost the fight via unanimous decision.

Torres next faced Bec Rawlings in a rematch at UFC Fight Night: Bermudez vs. The Korean Zombie on February 4, 2017. At the weigh-ins, Rawlings came in at 117.5 lbs, over the women's strawweight limit of 116 lbs. As a result, Rawlings was fined 20% of her purse, which went to Tecia Torres and the bout proceeded at a catchweight. Torres won the fight by unanimous decision.

Torres faced Juliana Lima on July 7, 2017, at The Ultimate Fighter 25 Finale. She won the fight via submission in the second round, making this the first stoppage victory in her professional career. The win also earned Torres her first Performance of the Night bonus award.

Torres faced Michelle Waterson on December 2, 2017, at UFC 218. She won the fight by unanimous decision.

Torres faced Jéssica Andrade on February 24, 2018, at UFC on Fox 28. She lost the fight via unanimous decision.

Torres faced former strawweight champion Joanna Jędrzejczyk on July 28, 2018, at UFC on Fox 30. She lost the fight by unanimous decision.

Torres faced Zhang Weili on March 2, 2019 at UFC 235. She lost the fight via unanimous decision.

Torres faced Marina Rodriguez on August 10, 2019 at UFC Fight Night 156. She lost the fight via unanimous decision.

Torres was scheduled to face Mizuki Inoue on March 28, 2020 at UFC on ESPN: Ngannou vs. Rozenstruik. Due to the COVID-19 pandemic, the event was eventually postponed . Instead, Torres face Brianna Van Buren on June 20, 2020 at UFC Fight Night: Blaydes vs. Volkov. She won the fight via unanimous decision.

A rematch with Angela Hill was expected to take place on December 12, 2020 at UFC 256. However, Hill tested positive for COVID-19 and pulled out of the fight. Torres instead faced promotional newcomer Sam Hughes. She won the fight via doctor stoppage between round one and two after Hughes said she couldn't see out of one of her eyes.

The rematch with Angela Hill was rescheduled and took place on August 7, 2021 at UFC 265. Torres won the fight via unanimous decision.

Torres faced Mackenzie Dern on April 9, 2022 at UFC 273. Despite surviving deep submission attempts in the second round, Torres lost the close bout via split decision.

Fighting style
Torres employs constant lateral movement while combining elements of taekwondo and karate. She frequently utilizes kicking techniques, occasionally following a high or low kick with a fast side kick. When punching, she will often press forward with a flurry of high strikes. Torres does not often utilize submission techniques, but has demonstrated submission defense.

Personal life
Torres is straight edge, claiming to have never used any alcohol, tobacco and other recreational drugs in her life. On the World Mental Health Day of 2019, Torres revealed having struggled with her mental health issues – depression and attachment disorder – for several years. She is openly part of the LGBTQ+ community and is married to former UFC women’s bantamweight title challenger Raquel Pennington.

Championships and accomplishments

Mixed martial arts
Ultimate Fighting Championship
Performance of the Night (One time)
MMA Solutions Global
MMA Solutions amateur strawweight title (one time)
US Freedom Fighter Championship
USFFC amateur strawweight title (one time)
American Battle Championships
ABC amateur strawweight title (one time)
Women's MMA Awards
2013 Strawweight of the Year
AwakeningFighters.com WMMA Awards
2013 Strawweight of the Year
2013 Newcomer of the Year
Bleacher Report
2013 WMMA Fight of the Year vs. Rose Namajunas on July 13

Mixed martial arts record

|-
|Loss
|align=center|13–6
|Mackenzie Dern
|Decision (split)
|UFC 273
|
|align=center|3
|align=center|5:00
|Jacksonville, Florida, United States
|
|-
|Win
|align=center|13–5
|Angela Hill
|Decision (unanimous)
|UFC 265
|
|align=center|3
|align=center|5:00
|Houston, Texas, United States
|
|-
|Win
|align=center|12–5
|Sam Hughes
|TKO (doctor stoppage)
|UFC 256
|
|align=center|1
|align=center|5:00
|Las Vegas, Nevada, United States
|
|-
|Win
|align=center|11–5
|Brianna Van Buren
|Decision (unanimous)
|UFC on ESPN: Blaydes vs. Volkov
|
|align=center|3
|align=center|5:00
|Las Vegas, Nevada, United States
|
|-
|Loss
|align=center|10–5
|Marina Rodriguez
|Decision (unanimous)
|UFC Fight Night: Shevchenko vs. Carmouche 2
|
|align=center|3
|align=center|5:00
|Montevideo, Uruguay
|
|-
|Loss
|align=center|10–4
|Zhang Weili
|Decision (unanimous)
|UFC 235
|
|align=center|3
|align=center|5:00
|Las Vegas, Nevada, United States
| 
|-
|Loss
|align=center|10–3
|Joanna Jędrzejczyk
|Decision (unanimous)
|UFC on Fox: Alvarez vs. Poirier 2
|
|align=center|3
|align=center|5:00
|Calgary, Alberta, Canada
|
|-
|Loss
|align=center|10–2
|Jéssica Andrade
|Decision (unanimous)
|UFC on Fox: Emmett vs. Stephens
|
|align=center|3
|align=center|5:00
|Orlando, Florida, United States
|
|-
|Win
|align=center|10–1
|Michelle Waterson
|Decision (unanimous)
|UFC 218
|
|align=center|3
|align=center|5:00
|Detroit, Michigan, United States
|
|-
|Win
|align=center|9–1
|Juliana Lima
|Submission (rear-naked choke)
|The Ultimate Fighter: Redemption Finale
|
|align=center|2
|align=center|0:53
|Las Vegas, Nevada, United States
|
|-
|Win
|align=center|8–1
|Bec Rawlings
|Decision (unanimous)
|UFC Fight Night: Bermudez vs. The Korean Zombie
|
|align=center|3
|align=center|5:00
|Houston, Texas, United States
|
|-
|Loss
|align=center|7–1
|Rose Namajunas
|Decision (unanimous)
|UFC on Fox: Teixeira vs. Evans
|
|align=center|3
|align=center|5:00
|Tampa, Florida, United States
|
|-
|Win
|align=center|7–0
|Jocelyn Jones-Lybarger
|Decision (unanimous)
|UFC 194
|
|align=center|3
|align=center|5:00
|Las Vegas, Nevada, United States
|
|-
|Win
|align=center|6–0
|Angela Hill
|Decision (unanimous)
|UFC 188
|
|align=center|3
|align=center|5:00
|Mexico City, Mexico
|
|-
|Win
|align=center|5–0
|Angela Magaña
|Decision (unanimous)
|The Ultimate Fighter: A Champion Will Be Crowned Finale
|
|align=center|3
|align=center|5:00
|Las Vegas, Nevada, United States
|
|-
|Win
|align=center|4–0
|Felice Herrig
|Decision (unanimous)
|Invicta FC 7: Honchak vs. Smith
|
|align=center|3
|align=center|5:00
|Kansas City, Missouri, United States
|
|-
|Win
|align=center|3–0
|Rose Namajunas
|Decision (unanimous)
|Invicta FC 6: Coenen vs. Cyborg
|
|align=center|3
|align=center|5:00
|Kansas City, Missouri, United States
|
|-
|Win
|align=center|2–0
|Paige VanZant
|Decision (unanimous)
|Invicta FC 4: Esparza vs. Hyatt
|
|align=center|3
|align=center|5:00
|Kansas City, Kansas, United States
|
|-
|Win
|align=center|1–0
|Kaiyana Rain
|Decision (unanimous)
|Invicta FC 3: Penne vs. Sugiyama
|
|align=center|3
|align=center|5:00
|Kansas City, Kansas, United States
|
|-

Mixed martial arts exhibition record

|-
|Loss
|align=center|1–2
| Carla Esparza
| Decision (majority)
| rowspan=3| The Ultimate Fighter: A Champion Will Be Crowned
| (airdate)
|align=center|2
|align=center|5:00
| rowspan=3|Las Vegas, Nevada, United States
|
|-
|Win
|align=center|1–1
| Bec Rawlings
| Decision (unanimous)
| (airdate)
|align=center|2
|align=center|5:00
|
|-
|Loss
|align=center|0–1
| Randa Markos
| Decision (unanimous)
| (airdate)
|align=center|3
|align=center|5:00
|

See also
 List of current UFC fighters
 List of female mixed martial artists

References

External links
 
 Tecia Torres at AwakeningFighters.com
 

1989 births
Living people
Sportspeople from Fall River, Massachusetts
Mixed martial artists from Massachusetts
American female mixed martial artists
Mixed martial artists utilizing taekwondo
Mixed martial artists utilizing karate
Mixed martial artists utilizing Muay Thai
Mixed martial artists utilizing Brazilian jiu-jitsu
American sportspeople of Puerto Rican descent
American Muay Thai practitioners
Female Muay Thai practitioners
American female karateka
Strawweight mixed martial artists
American practitioners of Brazilian jiu-jitsu
Female Brazilian jiu-jitsu practitioners
American female taekwondo practitioners
American people of Portuguese descent
American people of Irish descent
Lesbian sportswomen
LGBT Hispanic and Latino American people
LGBT mixed martial artists
LGBT people from Massachusetts
Ultimate Fighting Championship female fighters
LGBT Brazilian jiu-jitsu practitioners
LGBT karateka
LGBT Muay Thai practitioners
LGBT taekwondo practitioners